Wellesley College is a private women's liberal arts college in Wellesley, Massachusetts, United States. Founded in 1870 by Henry and Pauline Durant as a female seminary, it is a member of the original Seven Sisters Colleges, an unofficial grouping of elite current and former women's colleges in the northeastern United States. Wellesley's endowment of $3.226 billion is the largest out of all women's colleges and the 49th largest among all colleges and universities in the United States in 2019.  Wellesley is frequently considered to be one of the best liberal arts colleges in the United States. The college is currently ranked #5 on the National Liberal Arts College list produced by U.S. News & World Report.

Wellesley is home to 56 departmental and interdepartmental majors spanning the liberal arts, as well as over 150 student clubs and organizations. Wellesley athletes compete in the NCAA Division III New England Women's and Men's Athletic Conference. Its 500-acre (200 ha) campus was designed by Frederick Law Olmsted and houses the Davis Museum and a Botanic Garden.

Notable alumnae and affiliates include two U.S. secretaries of state; the first female nominee for President of the United States from a major party; noted academics, journalists, writers, politicians, diplomats, activists, businesspeople, filmmakers, and entertainers; and recipients of Emmy, Tony, Academy, and Peabody Awards, the Nobel Prize, and the Pulitzer Prize.

History

Wellesley was founded by Pauline and Henry Fowle Durant, believers in educational opportunity for women, who intended that the college should prepare women for "...great conflicts, for vast reforms in social life".  Its charter was signed on March 17, 1870, by Massachusetts Governor William Claflin. The original name of the college was the Wellesley Female Seminary; its renaming to Wellesley College was approved by the Massachusetts legislature on March 7, 1873. Wellesley first opened its doors to students on September 8, 1875. At the time of its founding, Wellesley College's campus was actually situated in Needham; however, in 1880 residents of West Needham voted to secede and in 1881 the area was chartered as a new town, Wellesley.

Wellesley College was a leading center for women's study in the sciences. Between 1875 and 1921, Wellesley employed more female scientists than any other U.S. institution of high education. After MIT, it was the second college in the United States to initiate laboratory science instruction for undergraduates. In early 1896, Sarah Frances Whiting, the first professor of physics and astronomy, was among the first U.S. scientists to conduct experiments in X-rays.

The first president of Wellesley was Ada Howard. There have been thirteen more presidents in its history: Alice Elvira Freeman Palmer, Helen Almira Shafer, Julia Josephine Thomas Irvine, Caroline Hazard, Ellen Fitz Pendleton, Mildred H. McAfee (later Mildred McAfee Horton), Margaret Clapp, Ruth M. Adams, Barbara Warne Newell, Nannerl Overholser Keohane (later the president of Duke University from 1993 to 2004), Diana Chapman Walsh, H. Kim Bottomly, and current president Paula Johnson.

It was completed in 1875. The architect was Hammatt Billings. College Hall was both an academic building and a residential building. On March 17, 1914, it was destroyed by fire, the precise cause of which was never officially established. The fire was first noticed by students who lived on the fourth floor near the zoology laboratory. It has been suggested that an electrical or chemical accident in this laboratory—specifically, an electrical incubator used in the breeding of beetles—triggered the fire.

A group of residence halls known as the Tower Court complex is located on top of the hill where the old College Hall once stood.

After the loss of the Central College Hall in 1914, the college adopted a master plan in 1921 and expanded into several new buildings. The campus hosted a Naval Reserve Officer Training program during the Second World War, and the College President Mildred McAfee took a leave of absence to lead the Women's Reserve of the U.S. Navy. She received the Distinguished Service Medal in 1945. Wellesley College began to significantly revise its curriculum after the war and through the late 1960s; in 1968, the college began its exchange programs between other colleges in the area such as MIT. In 2013 the faculty adopted an open-access policy to make its scholarship publicly accessible online.

The school has admitted transgender, non-binary, and genderqueer students since adopting an inclusive admissions policy in 2015.{https://www.wellesley.edu/news/gender-policy}

Campus

The  campus overlooks Lake Waban and includes evergreen, deciduous woodlands and open meadows. Frederick Law Olmsted, Jr., Boston's preeminent landscape architect at the beginning of the 20th century, described Wellesley's landscape as "not merely beautiful, but with a marked individual character not represented so far as I know on the ground of any other college in the country". He also wrote: "I must admit that the exceedingly intricate and complex topography and the peculiarly scattered arrangement of most of the buildings somewhat baffled me". The campus is adjacent to the privately owned Hunnewell Estates Historic District, the gardens of which can be viewed from the lake's edge on campus.

The original master plan for Wellesley's campus landscape was developed by Olmsted, Arthur Shurcliff, and Ralph Adams Cram in 1921. This landscape-based concept represented a break from the architecturally-defined courtyard and quadrangle campus arrangement that was typical of American campuses at the time. The  site's glaciated topography, a series of meadows, and native plant communities shaped the original layout of the campus, resulting in a campus architecture that is integrated into its landscape.

The campus offers multiple housing options, including Tower Court, which was built after College Hall burnt down, the Quad (Quint, including Munger), the “New Dorms”, referring to the east-side dormitories erected in the 1950s, and multiple “Branch Halls”, including both a Spanish and French-speaking house. In total, Wellesley offers 17 different residence halls for students to live in.

The most recent master plan for Wellesley College was completed in 1998 by Michael Van Valkenburgh Associates. According to the designers, this plan was intended to restore and recapture the original landscape character of the campus that had been partially lost as the campus evolved through the 20th century. In 2011, Wellesley was listed by Travel+Leisure as one of the most beautiful college campuses in the United States.

Wellesley is home to Green Hall, completed in 1931, the only building bearing the name of famed miser Hetty Green; the building was funded by her children. Part of the building is the Galen L. Stone Tower, housing a 32-bell carillon, which is routinely played between classes by members of the Guild of Carillonneurs.

Houghton Chapel was dedicated in 1899 in the center of the college campus.  The architectural firm of Heins & LaFarge designed Houghton of gray stone in the classic Latin cross floor plan. The exterior walls are pierced by stained glass windows. Window designers include Tiffany; John La Farge; Reynolds, Francis & Rohnstock; and Jeffrey Gibson.  The chapel can seat up to 750 people. Houghton is used by the college for a variety of religious and secular functions, like lectures and music concerts, and is also available for rental. The lower-level houses the Multifaith Center.

In 1905 Andrew Carnegie donated $125,000 to build what is now known as Clapp Library, on the condition that the college match the amount for an endowment.  The money was raised by 1907 and construction began June 5, 1909. In 1915 Carnegie gave another $95,446 towards an addition. This renovation added a recreational reading room, offices, archives, a reserve reading room, added space for rare books and additional stacks.  The building underwent renovations from 1956 to 1959, that doubled its size. From 1973 to 1975 a major addition was added to the right-hand side of the building.  In 1974 the building was renamed for Margaret Antoinette Clapp, a Pulitzer Prize-winning author and member of the 1930 class who served as the eighth college president from 1949 to 1966.

The Davis Museum, opened in 1993, was the first building in North America designed by Pritzker Prize-winning architect Rafael Moneo, whose notion of the museum as a “treasury” or “treasure chamber” informs its design.  The Davis is at the heart of the arts on the Wellesley campus adjacent to the academic quad and is connected by an enclosed bridge to the Jewett Arts Center, designed by Paul Rudolph. The collections span from ancient art from around the world to contemporary art exhibitions, and admission is free to the general public.

Administration

The current president of Wellesley College is Paula Johnson.  With a remarkable track record of accomplishments—she founded the Connors Center for Women's Health and Gender Biology at Brigham and Women's Hospital—she has led in the field of women's health, taking an interdisciplinary approach to biology by integrating insights from sociology, economics, and many other fields. Paula Johnson was the Grace A. Young Family Professor of Medicine in the Field of Women's Health at Harvard Medical School, as well as professor of epidemiology at the Harvard T.H. Chan School of Public Health. Johnson succeeded H. Kim Bottomly to become Wellesley's 14th President in July 2016.

Wellesley's fund-raising campaign in 2005 set a record for liberal arts colleges with a total of $472.3 million, 18.1% more than the goal of $400 million. According to data compiled by The Chronicle of Higher Education, Wellesley's campaign total is the largest of any liberal arts college. In late 2015, the college launched another campaign, with a goal of $500 million. Many notable alumnae including Madeleine Albright, Hillary Clinton, Diane Sawyer, Susan Wagner, and Cokie Roberts collaborated on the campaign video and launch festivities. As of Fall 2017, over $446 million has been raised.

Wellesley Centers for Women
The Wellesley Centers for Women (WCW) is one of the largest gender-focused social science research-and-action organizations in the United States.  Located on and nearby the Wellesley College campus, WCW was established when the Center for Research on Women (founded 1974) and the Stone Center for Development Services and Studies at Wellesley College (founded 1981) merged into a single organization in 1995. It is home to several prominent American feminist scholars, including Jean Kilbourne and Peggy McIntosh. The current executive director of the Wellesley Centers for Women is Layli Maparyan. Since 1974, the Wellesley Centers for Women has produced over 200 scholarly articles and over 100 books.

The Wellesley Centers for Women has five key areas of research — education, economic security, mental health, youth and adolescent development, and gender-based violence.  WCW is also home to long-standing and highly successful action programs that engage in curriculum development and training, professional development, evaluation, field building, and theory building. Those programs include the National SEED Project, the National Institute on Out-of-School Time, Open Circle, the Jean Baker Miller Training Institute, and Women's Review of Books.

Academics

Wellesley's average class size is between 17 and 20 students, with a student-faculty ratio of 8:1.  More than 50 departmental and interdepartmental majors are offered.

Wellesley offers support to nontraditional aged students through the Elisabeth Kaiser Davis Degree Program, open to students over the age of 24. The program allows women who, for various reasons, were unable to start or complete a bachelor's degree at a younger age to attend Wellesley.

Wellesley offers dual degree programs with the Massachusetts Institute of Technology and the Olin College of Engineering, enabling students to receive a Bachelor of Science at those schools in addition to a Bachelor of Arts at Wellesley. Wellesley also has a joint 5-year BA/MA program with Brandeis University's International Business School, which allows qualified Wellesley students to receive a Masters of Arts degree from the school as well as a Bachelor of Arts at Wellesley.

Wellesley College offers research collaborations and cross-registration programs with other Boston-area institutions, including Massachusetts Institute of Technology, Babson College, Olin College, and Brandeis University.

Its most popular majors, based on 2021 graduates, were:
Econometrics and Quantitative Economics (80)
Computer and Information Sciences (42)
Research and Experimental Psychology (39)
Biology/Biological Sciences (36)
Neuroscience (34)
Political Science and Government (31)

Admissions

The 2020 annual ranking of U.S. News & World Report categorizes admission to Wellesley as "most selective". For the Class of 2023 (enrolling fall 2019), the middle 50% range of SAT scores was 680–750 for evidence-based reading and 680–780 for math, while the middle 50% range for the ACT composite score was 31–34 for enrolled first-year students. For the incoming class of 2026, Wellesley received a record number of applications, totaling over 8,700 applications, and 13% of applicants were offered admission.

Transgender applicants 
The college's admissions policy was updated in 2015 to allow trans women and non-binary people assigned female at birth to be considered for admittance. While transgender and non-binary students have attended the college since its inception, media outlets recognize that the first Wellesley students who applied as out transgender women enrolled in Fall 2017.

Nontraditional age applicants 
Wellesley began its program for non-traditional students in 1971 when the Continuing Education Program was launched. This program was renamed in 1991 for Elisabeth Kaiser Davis, a member of the Class of 1932. Wellesley allows applicants older than 24 who had begun but have not completed a bachelor's degree to apply to the Elizabeth Kaiser Davis Degree Program. Davis Scholars are fully integrated into the Wellesley community; they take the same classes as traditional students and can choose to live on campus. According to the Wellesley web site, Davis Scholars' "diverse backgrounds, experiences and perspectives enrich the lives of the whole student body."

Rankings

In its 2021 rankings of national liberal arts colleges in the U.S., U.S. News & World Report ranked Wellesley tied for fourth best overall, first for women's colleges, 13th for "best value", tied at 11th for "best undergraduate teaching", and tied at 63rd for "top performers on social mobility".

In 2020, Washington Monthly ranked Wellesley 13th among 218 liberal arts colleges in the U.S. based on its contribution to the public good, as measured by social mobility, research, and promoting public service.

In addition, Forbes 2019 "America's Top Colleges" ranked the institution 44th among 650 U.S. colleges, service academies and universities. Wellesley College is accredited by the New England Commission of Higher Education.

Student life
Approximately 98% of students live on campus. Some cooperative housing is available, including a sustainable living co-op, a feminist co-op, and a French language house located slightly off-campus. Wellesley offers housing for Davis Scholars as well, though not for their children or spouses, which is a point of frequent debate on campus.

The college has four dining halls, one each in Tower Court, Stone-Davis, and Bates Halls, and another in the Lulu Chow Wang Campus Center. Additional food options on campus include a convenience store/coffee shop in the Campus Center, a bakery in Claflin Hall, Collins Café outside the movie theater, El Table, a student-run sandwich shop in Founders Hall (an academic building housing many of the humanities classes), and Café Hoop, a student-run cooperative cafe in the basement of the Campus Center that is known for its late hours and queer-friendly environment. Next to Café Hoop is the pub, Punch's Alley, which serves alcohol to those over 21.

For more than 50 years, Wellesley has offered a cross-registration program with MIT. Students can participate in research at MIT through the Undergraduate Research Opportunities Program (UROP). In recent years, cross-registration opportunities have expanded to include nearby Babson College, Brandeis University, and Olin College of Engineering. To facilitate cross-registration, the Wellesley College Senate bus connects Wellesley to the Harvard University and MIT campuses in Cambridge, Massachusetts; additionally, the college also operates a shuttle to the Babson College and Olin College campuses. It is also a member of a number of exchange programs with other small colleges, including opportunities for students to study a year at Amherst, Connecticut College, Dartmouth, Mount Holyoke, Smith, Trinity, Vassar, Wesleyan, and Wheaton.

Organizations
The college has approximately 180 student organizations, ranging from cultural and political organizations to community service, publications, campus radio, and club sports.

WZLY is the college's campus radio station. It is entirely student-run and plays on 91.5 FM in the town of Wellesley and some surrounding areas. Founded in 1942, it holds claim to be the oldest still-running women's college radio station in the country. In the 80s, it earned the nickname "Electric Ladyland" after the Jimi Hendrix album of the same name.

Wellesley College does not have any fraternities or sororities; it does, however, have a number of societies centered around common academic interests. There are currently six active societies on campus: Alpha Kappa Chi (the "history" society), Alpha Phi Sigma (the "lecture" society), Tau Zeta Epsilon (the "art and music" society), Zeta Alpha (the "literature" society), Agora Society (the "political science" society), and Shakespeare Society. The societies sponsor many lectures and events on campus and contribute funding to events sponsored by other departments and organizations. They have an application process called "tea-ing", and organize on-campus parties. The majority of students are not members of a society.

Publications on campus include Counterpoint, the monthly journal of campus life; The Wellesley News, the campus newspaper; International Relations Council Journal, the internationally oriented campus publication; The Wellesley Review, the literary magazine; and W.Collective, the fashion and lifestyle magazine.

Athletics

Wellesley fields 13 varsity sports teams – basketball, crew, cross country, fencing, field hockey, golf, lacrosse, soccer, softball, swimming & diving, tennis, track & field, and volleyball.  Wellesley does not have a mascot in the traditional sense – its sports teams are referred to both individually and collectively as "the Blue" (the school colors are royal blue and white). Wellesley's Student-Athlete Advisory Committee (SAAC) is composed of representatives from the athletic and club teams.

Wellesley is a member of the NCAA NCAA Division III and the Eastern Conference Athletic Conference (ECAC) and competes primarily as a member of the New England Women's and Men's Athletic Conference (NEWMAC).  Additionally, the fencing team competes as a member of the Northeast Fencing Conference (NFC), and the golf team became an associate member of the Liberty League during the 2012–2013 school year. In 1951 Barbara Bruning won the women's individual intercollegiate golf championship (an event conducted by the Division of Girls' and Women's Sports (DGWS) — which later evolved into the current NCAA women's golf championship).

Wellesley is also a member of the Seven Sisters consortium of women's colleges and participates in competitions in cross-country, volleyball, crew, swimming & diving, squash, and tennis.

Wellesley Athletics is headquartered out of the Keohane Sports Center (the KSC), named for the former college president Nannerl Keohane.  Built in 1985, the KSC features a field house, a pool, squash and racquetball courts, a 200m track, a climbing wall, four indoor tennis courts, and various other exercising areas.  It also houses administrative offices.  The campus also has four outdoor playing fields and an outdoor track, as well as eight outdoor tennis courts and a boathouse.

The Wellesley College Crew Team, affectionately known as "Blue Crew", was founded in 1970 and was the first women's intercollegiate rowing team in the country. In 2016, "Blue Crew" won the NCAA Division III Rowing Championship as a team for the first time in Wellesley history, with their first Varsity boat coming in first place and their second Varsity 8+ boat coming in second place. This historic win marked the first time a team from Wellesley College won a national championship, and also marked the first time a women's college won the NCAA Rowing Championships. In 2022, "Blue Crew" won the NCAA Division III Rowing Championship as a team for the second time in Wellesley history, with their first Varsity boat coming in second place and their second Varsity 8+ coming in second place. 

Wellesley also fields club teams in archery, alpine & Nordic skiing, equestrian, ice hockey, rugby, sailing, squash, Ultimate Frisbee, and water polo. Squash was originally a varsity sport but was downgraded to a club sport status in 2017. In addition, there is a Quidditch team that competes with teams from other colleges and universities in the area.

From 1943 to 1946, Judy Atterbury won multiple national intercollegiate women's tennis championships in both singles (1943, 1946) and doubles (1943, 1944). Nadine Netter won the Eastern Women's College Tournament in 1962, and was the Eastern Intercollegiate Champion and New England Intercollegiate women's Tennis Championship winner in 1965.

Wellesley has taken home two team national championships (Blue Crew's win at the NCAA Championships in 2016 and in 2022), three individual national champions, and one individual boat champion in its history.  In 1991, Karyn Cooper was the NCAA Tennis Singles Champion. In 2011, Randelle Boots was the NCAA Indoor Track & Field Champion in the mile. In 2015, Maura Sticco-Ivins was the NCAA National Champion in the three-meter diving competition and runner-up in the one-meter diving competition. Sticco-Ivins was named the 2015 NCAA Division III Diver of The Meet. Wellesley College Diving Coach Zach Lichter was voted the 2015 NCAA Division III Female Diving Coach of The Year. In 2022, Ari Marks won the NCAA DIII 10,000 Meter National Championship and the 5000 Meter NCAA DII National Championship. Marks was also named the 2022 NCAA Division III Women's Outdoor Track & Field National Track Athlete of the Year. In addition to these three individual champions, in 2016, Wellesley College's first Varsity 8+ boat became a national champion in its event at the NCAA Rowing Championships in Gold River, CA. Wellesley College Crew Team's head coach, Tessa Spillane, was voted the 2015-16 NCAA Division III Rowing Coach of The Year (after having also won the honor in 2010–2011). Additionally, Wellesley College Crew Team's coaching staff (Tessa Spillane, Hannah Woodruff, and Seth Hussey) received the 2015-16 Division III National Coaching Staff of the Year award. In 2022, Wellesley College Crew Team's coaching staff (Tessa Spillane, Emilie Muller, and Emilia Ball '19) were named the 2022 Collegiate Rowing Coaches Association NCAA Division III National Coach and Coaching Staff of the Year.

Traditions

Wellesley College has many traditions, some from the late nineteenth century. Some have been modified over time.

Hoop rolling is an annual tradition at the college that dates to 1895. Each upperclasswoman has a wooden hoop, often passed down to her from her "big sister". Before graduation, the seniors, wearing their graduation robes, run a short race while rolling their hoops. In the early 20th century, the winner was said to be the first in her class to marry; in the 1980s, the winner was said to become the class's first CEO; and since the 1990 Commencement speech by then-First Lady Barbara Bush, the winner has been said to be the first to achieve success; however, she defines it. The winner is awarded flowers by the president of the college, and then tossed into Lake Waban by her classmates. The tossing of the winner into the lake began several decades ago when a Harvard University male, dressed as a Wellesley student, won the race. When, upon his victory, it was discovered that he wasn't a Wellesley student, he was thrown into the lake. The night before the race, many "little sisters" will camp out on the racecourse near the Library to save a good starting position for their "big sisters".

Some other traditions include step-singing, dorm and class crew races, "Lake Day", "Spring Week", "Flower Sunday", and "Marathon Monday". Class trees are one of Wellesley's more visible traditions; each graduating class plants a tree during its sophomore year. Class trees, as they are called, can be found all over the campus, marked with each class year on a stone at the base of the tree. During sophomore year, students also design and purchase class sweatshirts.

The Wellesley campus sits just before the halfway mark on the Boston Marathon course, and students come out to cheer runners in what has become known as the "Scream Tunnel". Student have been cheering on runners since the first running of the marathon. In 1966 the school heard word that a woman was running in the race and turned out in numbers in cheer her on. Bobbi Gibb claims to have heard them from half a mile away. The women ran out into the road and raised their arms to form a tunnel. Diana Chapman Walsh, who would later serve as Wellesley president from 1993 to 2007, was present for the 1966 race. “The word spread to all of us lining the route that a woman was running the course. We scanned face after face in breathless anticipation until a ripple of recognition shot through the lines and we cheered as we never had before. We let out a roar that day, sensing that this woman had done more than just break the gender barrier in a famous race.”  Once women were officially allowed to register for the 1972 race, the campus cheer tradition became more popular. Eventually, students were restricted to cheering from the south side of the street.

Since 1970, the annual Alumnae Achievement Awards have recognized three alumnae for outstanding achievements in their fields. Recipients have included Lynn Sherr, Diane Sawyer, Pamela Melroy, Judith Martin, Nora Ephron, Ophelia Dahl, Hillary Clinton, and Madeleine Korbel Albright, among many others.

The Ruhlman and Tanner Conferences, supported by Wellesley alumnae, are held every year for students to share their learning experiences within the college community. Classes are canceled on these days. The Tanner Conference is held in the fall to celebrate outside-the-classroom education, including internships and summer or winter session research projects. Ruhlman, in the spring, is a chance for students to present projects they've been working on in courses or independent research during the year. Both conferences encompass panels, readings, and multimedia projects.

Student body
In 2015, 58 percent of all Wellesley students received financial aid; not including outside scholarships, the average grant awarded is $39,000. In 2020-2021, the average annual aid offer was over $56,000. In February 2008, the college stopped offering financial-aid loans to students from families with incomes under $60,000, including international students and Davis Scholars, and it lowered the total amount of student loans by one-third (to a maximum of $8,600 total over four years) to students from families with incomes between $60,000 and $100,000. The maximum loan level for other students on aid is $12,825 total for four years.

Of Wellesley's student body, as of 2019 less than half of the students are Caucasian, with roughly one-third of the student body identifying as Asian, and a significant number of Latina and African-American students. Students come from over 60 countries and all 50 states, with 90% of students hailing from outside of Massachusetts.

Notable alumnae and faculty

Notable alumnae
Wellesley's alumnae are represented among business executives and also work in a variety of other fields, ranging from government and public service to the arts. They include the first woman to be named professor of clinical medicine Connie Guion, class of 1906; architect Ann Beha, class of 1972; author Harriet Stratemeyer Adams (author and publisher) class of 1914; astronomer Annie Jump Cannon, class of 1884; archaeologist Josephine Platner Shear, class of 1924; astronaut Pamela Melroy class of 1983; screenwriter Nora Ephron, class of 1962; composers Elizabeth Bell and Natalie Sleeth; and professor and songwriter Katharine Lee Bates. Journalists Callie Crossley, Diane Sawyer, Cokie Roberts, Lynn Sherr, and Michele Caruso-Cabrera also graduated from Wellesley as did Sandra Lynch, United States Circuit Judge of the United States Court of Appeals for the First Circuit, and political scientist Jane Mansbridge, class of 1961. Rebecca Lancefield, a member of the National Academy of Sciences, graduated from Wellesley, as did Alice Ames Winter (B.A. 1886; M.A. 1889), president of the General Federation of Women's Clubs. Adaline Emerson Thompson, class of 1880, later served as a trustee for twenty years.

Both Madeleine Albright ('59), and Hillary Rodham Clinton ('69), have spoken about the formative impact their Wellesley experiences had on their careers. During her life, Secretary Albright returned annually to campus to lead the Madeleine Korbel Albright Institute for Global Affairs, a month-long pedagogical seminar where students learn more about global affairs through analysis and action. Additionally, three U.S. ambassadors (Julieta Valls Noyes, Anne Patterson, and Michele Sison) are Wellesley alumnae. Soong Mei-ling (also known as Madame Chiang Kai-shek), the former First Lady of China, graduated from Wellesley.

Other notable Wellesley graduates who have received the college's Alumnae Achievement Award''' include: Anna Medora Baetjer '20, public health expert, physiologist, toxicologist; Marian Burros '54, journalist, food writer; Sally Carrighar '22, writer, naturalist; Elyse Cherry '75, an entrepreneur, financial, and social equity activist; Suzanne Ciani '68, electronic music composer, recording artist; Phyllis Curtin '43, opera singer; Jocelyn Gill '38, astronomer; Marjory Stoneman Douglas '12, environmental activist, author; Persis Drell '77, particle physicist; Nora Ephron '62, writer and director; Helen Hays '53, ornithologist; Dorothea Jameson '42, psychologist; Jean Kilbourne '64, media educator; Judith Martin '59, (pen name Miss Manners) author; Nergis Mavalvala '90, a quantum astrophysicist; Lorraine O'Grady '55, conceptual artist and cultural critic; Santha Rama Rau '45, writer; Marilyn Yalom '54, historian, feminist scholar; and Patricia Zipprodt '46, costume designer.

Notable faculty

Notable Wellesley faculty include:

 Myrtilla Avery, art historian and a Monuments Men
 Emily Green Balch, Nobel Peace Prize-awarded economist and peace activist.
 Katharine Lee Bates, award-winning poet, novelist, essayist, and the author of "America the Beautiful", a Wellesley College alumna and the namesake of Bates Residential Hall.
 Frank Bidart, Pulitzer Prize-winning poet.
 Karl E. Case, an economist who researches real estate and developed the Case-Shiller index with Robert Shiller from Yale and Allan Weiss.
 Dan Chiasson, poet and New Yorker writer
 Margaret Clapp, Pulitzer Prize-winning author and the namesake of the main library.
 Katharine Coman, an economic historian credited with creating the field of industrial history; first female faculty member to teach statistics in the US.
 Rose Laub Coser, sociologist, a former vice president of the American Sociological Association (ASA) and a former president of Eastern Sociological Society (ESS), credited with creating the fields of medical sociology, role theory, and sociology of the family.
 Alona E. Evans, political scientist, an expert in international law including terrorists, fugitives, and refugees, first woman president of the American Society of International Law
 Jorge Guillén, Spanish poet and literary critic
 Charlotte Houtermans (born Charlotte Riefenstahl), physicist
 Jonathan B. Knudsen, History professor who published books on German Enlightenment
 Frances Lowater, physicist and astronomer
 Mary Kate McGowan, Luella LaMer Professor of Women's Studies and Professor of Philosophy, notable for her work in the feminist philosophy of language
 Peggy McIntosh, women's studies scholar whose 1988 published works on the concept of privilege led to the identification of various privileges and laid the foundation for the current "check your privilege" movement.
 Vladimir Nabokov, a Russian-American novelist best known for his novel Lolita''. He taught Comparative Literature and Russian at Wellesley.
 Susan Mokotoff Reverby, Women's and Gender Studies professor who uncovered the American 1946–48 syphilis experiments in Guatemala.
 Alan Schechter, former Chairman of the Fulbright and mentor to Hillary Rodham Clinton during her years at Wellesley.
 Paul K. MacDonald, Political Scientist in the field of International Relations
 Adrian Piper, the first Black female philosophy professor to receive tenure in the U.S., and a renowned conceptual artist.
 Helen L. Webster (1853-1928), philologist and educator
 Sarah Frances Whiting, physicist and astronomer

See also
Wellesley College Botanic Gardens
Wellesley College Tupelos, singing group
Women's colleges in the United States

References

External links

 
 Wellesley College Athletics website

 
1875 establishments in Massachusetts
Educational institutions established in 1875
Liberal arts colleges in Massachusetts
Seven Sister Colleges
Universities and colleges in Norfolk County, Massachusetts
Wellesley, Massachusetts
Women's universities and colleges in the United States
Private universities and colleges in Massachusetts